The 1949 Toledo Rockets football team was an American football team that represented Toledo University during the 1949 college football season. In their second and final season under head coach Skip Stahley, the Rockets compiled a 6–4 record, outscored their opponents by a combined total of 318 to 210, and lost to Mid-American Conference champion Cincinnati, 33–13, in the fourth postseason Glass Bowl game.

During the 1949 season, Toledo back Emerson Cole, who later played in the NFL, rushed 160 times for 1,172 yards, an average of 7.26 yards per carry. On November 12, 1949, Cole rushed for 230 yards against North Dakota. Cole's 1,172 rushing yards stood as a Toledo single-season record until 1984. The 1939 Toledo team averaged 253.8 rushing yards per game. Ed Burrus and George Miley were the team captains.

Schedule

References

Toledo
Toledo Rockets football seasons
Toledo Rockets football